The 2018 European Open Water Swimming Championships was the 17th edition of the European Open Water Swimming Championships (was part of the 2018 European Aquatics Championships, in turn part of the 2018 European Championships) and took part from 8–12 August 2018 in Loch Lomond near Glasgow, United Kingdom.

Results

Men

Women

Mixed events

Medal table

See also
 2018 European Championships
 List of medalists at the European Open Water Swimming Championships

References

External links
 Ligue Européenne de Natation LEN Official Website

European Open Water Swimming Championships
European Open Water Championships